Sraosha ( or  ) is the Avestan name of the Zoroastrian yazata of "Conscience" and "Observance", which is also the literal meaning of his name.

This form appears in many variants in New Persian as well, for example , Sorūsh. Unlike many of the other Yazatas (concepts that are "worthy of adoration"), Sraosha is also frequently referred to as the "Angel of Conscience" or "Voice of Conscience", which overlaps with both of his role as the "Teacher of Daena", Daena being the hypostasis of both "Conscience" and "Religion" and Guardian/Companion over the Chinvat Bridge.

In scripture

In Zoroaster's revelation
Sraosha is already attested in the Gathas, the oldest texts of Zoroastrianism and believed to have been composed by Zoroaster himself. In these earliest texts, Sraosha is routinely associated with the Amesha Spentas, the six "Bounteous Immortals" through which Ahura Mazda realized ("created by His/Her thought") creation.

In the Gathas, Sraosha's primary function is to propagate conscience and the beauty of life, secondly the religion of Ahura Mazda to humanity, as Sraosha himself learned it from Ahura Mazda. This is only obliquely alluded to in these old verses but is only properly developed in later texts (Yasna 57.24, Yasht 11.14 etc.). Directly evident in the Gathas is the description as the strongest, the sturdiest, the most active, the swiftest, and the most awe-inspiring of youths (Yasna 57.13), and as the figure that the poor look to for support (57.10).

In the ethical goals of Zoroastrianism ("good thoughts, good words, good deeds") as expressed in Yasna 33.14, Sraosha is identified with good deeds. This changes in Zoroastrian tradition (Denkard 3.13-14), where Sraosha is identified with good words. In Yasna 33.5, the poet speaks of Sraosha as the greatest of all (decision makers) at the final renovation of the world.

In 50.4-5, the poet sees the path of Sraosha (an allusion to the Chinvat bridge) as 
In 43.46, Zoroaster is reminded to hurry with the propagation of Mazda's message before the prophet's death (before he encounters Sraosha and Ashi). In 44.16, Sraosha and Vohu Manah ("Conscience" and "Good Thought") are said to be brought to all humankind.

In the younger Avesta
Sraosha has two yashts dedicated to him. One of these is Yasna 56–57, which is part of the primary Zoroastrian act of adoration. Yasna 56-57 is a "hidden" yasht in that those verses describe a devotee's relationship with Sraosha but do not directly address him. The other hymn to the divinity is Yasht 11, which is a direct invocation of Sraosha and bears his name in the title. Yasht 11 - like the other direct Yashts also - is not part of the liturgy of the Avesta proper. Yasht 11 has survived in a fragment of the Hadhokht Nask, which is today part of the Khordeh Avesta, the "little Avesta."

In Yasna 56–57, Sraosha is variously described as mighty, the incarnate word of reason, whose body is the holy spell (57.1). Sraosha "possesses Truth" (ashavanem) and is "stately" (57.2, 57.5, 57.7, 57.9, 57.11, 57.15 etc.). He is said to have been the first in all of creation to adore Ahura Mazda and the Amesha Spentas. (57.2 and 57.6). He recited five holy verses in order to favor the great sextet (57.8), and the Ahuna Vairya invocation and other sacred formulae are Sraosha's weapons (57.22). He returned victorious from his battles with evil (57.12), which allowed the various aspects of creation to populate the world (57.23). Sraosha wanders about the world teaching the religion of Mazda (57.24). Sraosha is frequently described as the "lord of ritual" (57.2, 57.5, 57.7, 57.9, 57.11 etc.) and he propitiates haoma with sacrifice (57.19).

In Yasht 11, mankind lives under Sraosha's constant guardianship (11.7). He is not interrupted by sleep in his constant vigil (11.14) in which he wields his weapons against the druj (11.0). Sraosha teaches the word of Ahura Mazda to mankind (11.14). The poor look to him for support (11.3) and he is welcome in all homes that he protects (11.20).

In yet other texts Sraosha is again protector of ritual, but here the celebrant priest receives the epithet Sraoshavarez (Yasht 24.15; Vendidad 5.25, 7.17 et al.). In Vendidad 18.22, Sraosha is called for help against the demon-serpent Azi Dahaka who threatens to extinguish the hearth fire (cf. Atar).

Sraosha is the chief adversary of Aeshma, the daeva of wrath, for Aeshma distracts from proper worship, distorting "the intention and meaning of sacrifice through brutality against cattle and violence in war and drunkenness." While Aeshma's standard epithet is xrvi.dru- "of the bloody mace," Sraosha's standard epithet is darshi.dru- "of the strong (Ahuric) mace."  Sraosha will overthrow Aeshma at the renovation of the world (Yasht 19.95).

In Zoroastrian tradition
In Zoroastrian tradition, Sraosha is one of the three guardians of the Chinvat bridge, the "bridge of judgement" that all souls of the dead must cross. Although Sraosha is only one of the three divinities that pass judgement (the other two being Rashnu and Mithra), Sraosha alone accompanies the soul on their journey across the bridge.

As also the other two guardians of the bridge, Sraosha is closely identified with Ashi, "Recompense". In Yasht 17.15 and 17.17, Sraosha is called Ashi's "brother." One of Sraosha's stock epithets is ashya, which may either mean "companion of recompense" or simply "companion of Ashi".

In the day-name dedications of the Zoroastrian calendar, the seventeenth day of the month is dedicated to Sraosha.

References

Sources 
 , p. 182.
 
 

Yazatas